The Nevada Wolf Pack football statistical leaders are individual statistical leaders of the Nevada Wolf Pack football program in various categories, including passing, rushing, receiving, total offense, defensive stats, and kicking. Within those areas, the lists identify single-game, single-season, and career leaders. The Wolf Pack represent the University of Nevada, Reno in the NCAA's Mountain West Conference (MW).

Although Nevada began competing in intercollegiate football in 1896, the school's official record book does not include many statistics from before the 1940s, because records from before this year are often incomplete and inconsistent.

These lists are dominated by more recent players for several reasons:
 Since the 1940s, seasons have increased from 10 games to 11 and then 12 games in length.
 Additionally, Nevada has been grouped in the same MW football division as Hawaii since divisional play began in 2013, meaning that it plays at Hawaii every other year. This is relevant because the NCAA allows teams that play at Hawaii in a given season to schedule 13 regular-season games instead of the normal 12. However, Nevada has not chosen to play a 13-game schedule in any season since 2013, even though it has had the option to do so twice.
 The NCAA didn't allow freshmen to play varsity football until 1972 (with the exception of the World War II years), allowing players to have four-year careers.
 Bowl games only began counting toward single-season and career statistics in 2002. The Wolf Pack have played in 10 bowl games since the decision, giving players in those seasons an extra game to accumulate statistics.
 Due to COVID-19 issues, the NCAA ruled that the 2020 season would not count against the athletic eligibility of any football player, giving everyone who played in that season the opportunity for five years of eligibility instead of the normal four.

These lists are updated through the end of the 2016 season.

Passing

Passing yards

Passing touchdowns

Rushing

Rushing yards

Rushing touchdowns

Receiving

Receptions

Receiving yards

Receiving touchdowns

Total offense
Total offense is the sum of passing and rushing statistics. It does not include receiving or returns.

Total offense yards

Touchdowns responsible for
"Touchdowns responsible for" is the NCAA's official term for combined passing and rushing touchdowns.

The 2014 Nevada Wolf Pack Media Guide does not have any lists for total touchdowns responsible for, and since the Wolf Pack did not play in the FBS (formerly I-A) until 1992, most Internet statistical listing do not list the full history of Nevada's statistics. However, as Colin Kaepernick is the school leader in both passing touchdowns and rushing touchdowns, it is safe to say his 141 touchdowns responsible for are the school record (82 passing, 59 rushing; he also caught 1 touchdown pass that does not count toward this statistical measure).

Defense

Interceptions

Tackles

Sacks

Kicking

Field goals made

Field goal percentage

References

Nevada

Nevada sports-related lists